is a micro-asteroid, classified as a near-Earth object of the Apollo group. It was first observed by ATLAS at Mauna Loa Observatory on 10 November 2017, a day after it passed inside the orbit of Earth.

Orbit and classification 

 is an Apollo asteroid, the largest subgroup of near-Earth objects. It orbits the Sun at a distance of 0.9–1.5 AU once every 16 months (498 days; semi-major axis of 1.23 AU). Its orbit has an eccentricity of 0.23 and an inclination of 12° with respect to the ecliptic. It is, however, not a Mars-crossing asteroid, as its aphelion of 1.51 AU is less than the orbit of the Red Planet at 1.666 AU.

Close approaches 

On 9 November 2017, it came within 0.31 lunar distances of the Earth (see diagrams).

Physical characteristics 

 has been estimated to measure between 6 and 32 meters in diameter, comparable to the Chelyabinsk meteor, which was also not observed before it hit the atmosphere over Russia in 2013. For an assumed albedo of 0.20, which is typical for the common S-type asteroids, 's  diameter would be likely 18 meters only.  The size of asteroid 2017 VL2 has been described as that of a whale.

As of 2018, no rotational lightcurve of this asteroid has been obtained from photometric observations. The object's rotation period, pole and shape remain unknown.

Numbering and naming 

This minor planet has not yet been numbered by the Minor Planet Center and remains unnamed.

References

External links 
 MPEC 2017-V67 : 2017 VL2 minor planet center
 
 
 

Minor planet object articles (unnumbered)
Near-Earth objects in 2017
20171110